Baretle is a village outside of Mosul, Iraq near Bashiqah mountain.

During the Syrian Civil war, the village was controlled by Daesh forces. By 2017, with the retaking of Mosul the otherwise insignificant village had become the frontline, in the ongoing conflict.

References

Mosul